The Florida Gators women's gymnastics team represents the University of Florida in the sport of gymnastics.  The team competes in Division I of the National Collegiate Athletics Association (NCAA) and the Southeastern Conference (SEC).  The Gators host their home matches in the O'Connell Center on the university's Gainesville, Florida campus, and are currently led by head coach Jenny Rowland.  The Gators women's gymnastics program has won nine SEC championships, and four national championships: the 1982 AIAW national tournament and the 2013, 2014, and 2015 NCAA championships.

History 

The University of Florida first fielded a women's varsity gymnastics team in the fall of 1973. Gymnastics was one of the first women's sports added at the University of Florida and achieved early success by winning the 1982 Association for Intercollegiate Athletics for Women (AIAW) championship (the AIAW was the governing body for women's college sports from 1971 to 1982). Since the NCAA assumed sponsorship for women's sports championships in 1982, Florida has advanced to the NCAA championships (top twelve) every year but one. The Gators have advanced to the "Super Six" finals of the NCAA championships nineteen times.  Florida has finished twice as runner-up (1998 and 2012) and won NCAA championships in 2013, 2014, and 2015.

Ernestine Weaver was the head coach of the Gators gymnastics program from 1980 to 1992 and was responsible for much of the team's early success in AIAW, NCAA, and SEC competition. Under Weaver, the Gators won five SEC championships, the AIAW national championship in 1982, and appeared in thirteen consecutive NCAA championships; Gators gymnasts won five AIAW and NCAA individual national championships. Judi Markell succeeded Weaver as head coach in 1993 and her teams qualified for nine NCAA championships in ten seasons, including three Super Six appearances and a second-place finish in 1998; Markell's Gators won three individual national championships.

The Gators were coached by Rhonda Faehn from 2003-2015; they won four SEC championships and appeared in the NCAA championships every year, including ten Super Six appearances, a national runner-up performance in 2012, and three straight national championships from 2013-2015. The 2014 NCAA championship team scored the highest total ever at an NCAA championship with a 198.175.  Faehn's Gators won nine individual national championships. Marissa King won the vault title in 2011, Kytra Hunter won the all-around and vault title in 2012 and the all-around and floor titles in 2015, Alaina Johnson won the uneven bars title in 2013, and Bridget Sloan won the all-around and balance beam titles in 2013 and the uneven bars title in 2014.

After Faehn's resignation following the 2015 national championship, Florida hired Auburn assistant Jenny Rowland to be the new head coach. In Jenny's first year as head coach she led the Gators to their 10th SEC title and fourth in seven years.

Individual national champions 

Twelve Florida Gators gymnasts have won a total of thirty-one individual national college championships, including Ann Woods (1982 AIAW all-around, floor exercise, uneven bars), Lynn McDonnell (1982 AIAW balance beam), Maria Anz (1984 NCAA floor exercise), Susan Hines (1997 NCAA vault; 1998 NCAA vault), Betsy Hamm (1998 NCAA balance beam), Marissa King (2011 NCAA vault), Kytra Hunter (2012 NCAA all-around and vault title, 2015 all-around and floor title), Alaina Johnson (2013 NCAA Bars), Bridget Sloan (2013 NCAA all-around, beam; 2014 NCAA Bars; 2016 NCAA All-Around, Bars, and Beam), Alex McMurtry (2017 NCAA all-around and bars; 2018 NCAA vault), Alicia Boren(2019 NCAA Floor), and Trinity Thomas (2022 NCAA all-around, floor exercise, and uneven bars).

Roster 
Below is a roster of gymnasts on the team for the 2022–2023 season.

Head coach: Jenny Rowland
Assistant coach: Adrian Burde
Assistant coach: Owen Field
Volunteer assistant coach: Jeremy Miranda
Assistant to Head coach: Brittany Arlington
Athletic trainer: Janet Taylor
Student coach: Vanasia Bradley

Future recruits 
Below are gymnasts who have committed to Florida.

2023–24 Commits
 Skye Blakely – WOGA – 2022 World champion (team), 2019 Junior World bronze medalist (team)

All-American selections 

All-American selections through the 2012 season.

 Maria Anz (1984)
 Mackenzie Caquatto (2012)
 Amanda Castillo (2007, 2008)
 Ashanee Dickerson (2010, 2011*, 2012)
 Erinn Dooley (2003*, 2004, 2005*)
 Savannah Evans (2004*, 2006, 2007)
 Amy Ferguson (2012*)
 Courtney Gladys (2010*)
 Alicia Goodwin (2009, 2010*)
 Jaime Graziano (1997*)
 Kristin Guise (1993*, 1994, 1995, 1996)
 Betsy Hamm (1998)
 Corey Hartung (2006, 2007, 2008, 2009)
 Susan Hines (1996*, 1997, 1998)
 Kytra Hunter (2012)
 Alaina Johnson (2011, 2012*)
 Colleen Johnson (1993*)
 Janice Kerr (1988^)
 Breanne King (2004*, 2007*)
 Marissa King (2010, 2011, 2012)
 Samantha Lutz (2004, 2006*)
 Elizabeth Mahlich (2009*)
 Lana Marty (1982)
 Christina McDonald (1991)
 Lynn McDonnell (1981, 1982)
 Melissa Miller (1987, 1988, 1989)
 Lindsey Miner (2002, 2003)
 Tiffany Murry (2006*)
 Amy Myerson (1994, 1995)
 Lisa Panzironi (1994*)
 Ashley Reed (2007, 2008)
 Katie Rue (2004*)
 Elfi Schlegel (1983, 1984, 1985)
 Melanie Sinclair (2007, 2008, 2009)
 Maranda Smith (2009, 2010, 2011)
 Tammy Smith (1985)
 Sybil Stephenson (1995*, 1996*, 1997)
 Kristen Stucky (2003*)
 Orley Szmuch (2003*, 2004)
 Hilary Thompson (2001, 2002*)
 Pam Titus (1989, 1990, 1991)
 Chantelle Tousek (2004)
 Chrissy Van Fleet (1997, 1998, 1999*, 2000*)
 Chrissy Vogel (1995, 1996, 1997*)
 Kara Waterhouse (2001*)
 Nicola Willis (2008)
 Tracy Wilson (1990)
 Ann Woods (1980, 1981, 1982)
 Rebekah Zaiser (2010*)

Second-team All-American honors are designated with an asterisk (*).
H. Boyd McWhorter Award winners (top SEC male and female scholar-athletes) are designated with a caret (^).

Regular Season All-American Awards 
The National Association of Collegiate Gymnastics Coaches (NAGCS) started awarding All-American honors for a gymnast's regular season performance. The top 8 gymnasts in each event and the all-around receive first team honors and gymnasts ranked 9 to 16 receive second team honors.

The score is based on the National Qualifying Score (NQS) in the RoadtoNationals.com rankings.

Team Records

Top Team Total

Top Vault Total

Top Uneven Bars Total

Top Balance Beam Total

Top Floor Total

Past Olympians 
 Christina McDonald  (1988)
 Nicola Willis  (2004)
 Marissa King  (2008)
 Bridget Sloan (2008) 
 Kayla DiCello (2020 alternate)
 Leanne Wong (2020 alternate)

See also 

 Florida Gators
 History of the University of Florida
 List of University of Florida Athletic Hall of Fame members
 List of University of Florida Olympians
 University Athletic Association

References

External links 
 

 
Sports clubs established in 1973
1973 establishments in Florida